Sussex National Bank of Seaford is a historic bank building located at Seaford, Sussex County, Delaware. It was built in 1887, and is a one-story, two bay, rectangular brick structure with a low hipped roof.  It features an elaborate brick cornice, showcase window, spires and gable, and brick work detail.

It was added to the National Register of Historic Places in 1987.

References

Bank buildings on the National Register of Historic Places in Delaware
Commercial buildings completed in 1887
Buildings and structures in Sussex County, Delaware
Seaford, Delaware
National Register of Historic Places in Sussex County, Delaware